Wuyigongyuan (literally "Wuyi Park" or "May 1 Park") is a metro station of Zhengzhou Metro. The station lies beneath the crossing of Jianshe Road and Tongbai Road and is the interchange station between Line 1 and Line 5.

The station was first opened as Tongbai Road, after the road. It was later changed to the current name before the opening of Line 5, possibly to avoid confusions after the operations of Line 5, which runs beneath Tongbai Road for a long distance and have several stations on the road, started.

Station layout  
The station has 3 levels underground. The B1 level is for the station concourse, the B2 level is for the platforms and tracks of Line 1 and the B3 level is for Line 5.

Exits

Surroundings 
 Wuyi Park
 Henan Workers Culture Palace

References

External links 

Stations of Zhengzhou Metro
Line 1, Zhengzhou Metro
Line 5, Zhengzhou Metro
Railway stations in China opened in 2013